Web archiving is the process of collecting portions of the World Wide Web to ensure the information is preserved in an archive for future researchers, historians, and the public.

Web archive may also refer to:
Webarchive, file format for saving and reviewing complete web pages using the Safari web browser
Web ARChive, archive format
Wayback Machine,  digital archive of the World Wide Web and other information on the Internet
Web archive file, file that archives inside it all the content of one web page
Web application archive, or WAR, file format

See also
Internet archive (disambiguation)